Rahim Ullah (born 1 March 1958) is a Bangladeshi politician and the current member of parliament from Feni-3 constituency.

Early life
Rahim Ullah was born on 1 March 1958, to a Bengali Muslim family in Feni, Noakhali District, East Pakistan.

Career
Ullah was elected to Parliament from Feni-3 in 2014 Bangladesh General Election. He beat Anwarul Karim of the Jatiya Party in the election. He is the president of Bangladesh Awami League unit of Jeddah. He is a political rival of Nizam Hazari, fellow Bangladesh Awami League politician and Member of Parliament from Feni. On 7 February 2016 his motorcarade was attacked in Feni by Bangladesh Jubo League and Bangladesh Chhatra League. The attack was believed to be a fallout from his rivalry with Nizam Hazari.

References

Awami League politicians
Living people
10th Jatiya Sangsad members
1958 births
People from Feni District